= It Rhymes With Truth =

2024 novel by Rich Miller

- Author: Rich Miller
- Genre: Tragicomedy; Coming of age
- Publisher: Lost Pictograph
- Publication date: June 21, 2024
- Pages: 230
- ISBN: 979-8-9907709-0-4

It Rhymes With Truth is a 2024 tragicomical coming of age novel by Rich Miller. The novel is about an unnamed 8-and-a-half-year-old homeless boy who is taken in by an elderly woman named Ruth. She lives in a retirement home and hides the boy there during the events of the novel. The book is narrated by the boy at age 18, looking back on a decade of life with Ruth.

== Reception ==
It Rhymes With Truth has received a number of accolades from book awards and book reviewers, including:

- Foreword INDIES Book of the Year Award winner
- Chanticleer International Book Awards semi-finalist for literary novels
- NIEA Book Awards 2025 Finalist for literary fiction
- Notable 100 honor from the Shelf Unbound book awards
- Rated one of the top 50 literary fiction novels of 2024 in the BookLife Prize Awards by Publishers Weekly
- Selected as BlueInk Review’s must-buy novel for 2024 in their annual gift guide
- 5-Star review by Clarion Reviews
- “Editor’s Choice” selection by BookLife/Publishers Weekly
- Starred review from Kirkus Reviews
- Starred review from Blue Ink Reviews
- Positive view from Booklist
- “IR Approved” rating from IndieReader
- Unanimous 5-Star reviews from Readers’ Favorite
